Wzgórza Krzesławickie is one of 18 districts of Kraków, located in the northeast part of the city. The name Wzgórza Krzesławickie comes from a village named Krzesławice (first mentioned in 1228) that is now a part of the district. 

Subdivisions of Wzgórza Krzesławickie
Wzgórza Krzesławickie is divided into smaller subdivisions (osiedles). Here's a list of them.
 Dłubnia
 Grębałów
 Kantorowice
 Krzesławice
 Lubocza
 Łuczanowice
 Osiedle Na Stoku
 Osiedle Na Wzgórzach
 Wadów
 Węgrzynowice
 Zesławice

Population

References

External links
 Official website of Wzgórza Krzesławickie
 Biuletyn Informacji Publicznej

Districts of Kraków